Aşağı means "lower" in Turkic languages. It may refer to:

Places

Other
 Asagi, a variety of koi

See also
 Yukarı (disambiguation), "upper"